Les Georges Leningrad were a Canadian experimental rock and punk rock group  based in Montreal, Quebec.

Les Georges Leningrad were known for their extravagant stage costumes, including masks in particular. They frequently gave contradictory, incomprehensible or ludicrous answers to interviewers' questions. They have been elected twice "freakiest local act" by the readers of the weekly newspaper Montreal Mirror.

History
Les Georges Leningrad formed in 1999 in Montreal. The members took turns at bass, keyboard, guitar, drums and vocals, sometimes using a drum machine. The band originally consisted of four members; they were reduced to a trio with the departure of bassist Toundra LaLouve after their first album was released. The band produced several albums, 2002'a  including Sur les Traces de Black Eskimo in 2004.

In 2007 the band created the score for Asparagus: A Horticultural Ballet, which was performed at Conway Hall in London, England.

After announcing in early 2007 on their MySpace page that they had broken up, Les Georges Leningrad now say that they may play more shows sometime in the future.

Members

Poney P (vocals)
Mingo L'Indien (keyboards, guitar)
Bobo Boutin (drums)

Discography
2002 Made In Taiwan
2002 Deux Hot Dogs Moutarde Chou (Les Records Coco Cognac)
2004 Sur les Traces de Black Eskimo (Alien8 Recordings)
2005 Supa Doopa Remix (Troubleman Unlimited)
2006 Sangue Puro (Dare to Care Records, Tomlab)

See also

List of bands from Canada

References

External links
Les Georges Leningrad at Exclaim!
Les Georges Leningrad at allmusic
Alien8 Recordings
PUNKCAST#352 Live Video @ Mighty Robot, Brooklyn - Oct 25, 2003. (RealPlayer)

Musical groups from Montreal
Canadian experimental musical groups
Canadian indie rock groups
Canadian experimental rock groups
Alien8 Recordings artists
Musical groups established in 1999
Musical groups disestablished in 2007
1999 establishments in Quebec
2007 disestablishments in Quebec